Kaikavolu is a village in East Godavari District, Pedapudi Mandal, Andhra Pradesh, India.

Demographics
According to Indian census, 2001, the demographic details of this village is as follows:
 Total Population: 	2,038 in 575 Households.
 Male Population: 	1,052 and Female Population: 	986
 Children Under 6-years: 232 (Boys - 132 and Girls - 100)
 Total Literates: 	1,055

General information

 Telugu film actor Krishna Bhagavan was born in this village.

References

External links
Kaikavolu information
A Temple in Kaikavolu Village

Villages in East Godavari district